Rudolf Bial (26 August 1834 – 23 November 1881) was a German violinist, composer, conductor and theater director.

Life 
Born in Bystrzyca Kłodzka, Province of Silesia, Bial received his musical education in Breslau, where he was employed at the age of 15 as the first violinist in the chapel of the local municipal theatre. He was Kapellmeister in Lübeck from 1854 to 1856, then made a concert tour to Australia as a violin virtuoso together with his brother Karl, became Kapellmeister in 1864 at August Conradi's place at Wallner-Theater in Berlin and from 1876 to 1879 was the director of the Krollschen Theater, whose repertoire he refined by cultivating German and Italian operas. In the latter year he moved to New York. There he led a concert band and died at the age of 47.

His brother Karl Bial (1833-1892) worked as a piano virtuoso, composer and music teacher in Berlin. He left behind several pieces for piano and songs.

Work 
Among Rudolf Bial's partly popular compositions (in total 130 numbers) his operetta Der Herr von Papillon (1868) had the greatest success.

 1872: Die Mottenburger, burlesque with music
 1874: Mein Leopold, burlesque with music (singing burlesque in three acts), premiere 28 September 1874
 1875: Der Liebesring, burlesque with music (singing burlesque in three acts), premiere 4 December 1875, Berlin, Städtisches Friedrich-Wilhelm Theater
 1876: Der Registrator auf Reisen, burlesque with music (singing burlesque in three acts), premiere 12 February 1876
 ???: Ehrliche Arbeit, burlesque with music (singing burlesque in three acts)
 ???: Von Stufe zu Stufe, burlesque with music
 ???: Hopfenraths Erben, burlesque with music
 ???: Comtesse Helene, burlesque in three acts

Marches:
 Donato-March for Pianoforte, 1865
 Kladderadatsch-Jubiläums-March, 1866, on the occasion of the celebration of the publication of the thousandth issue of the political satirical weekly Kladderadatsch

References

Further reading 
 
 Bial, Rudolf on 
 Ewald Oswald Röder: Geborene Schlesier (Tonkünstlerlexikon), 1846/47

External links 

 
 
 
 Rudolf Bial, digitalisierte Publikationen in der UB Frankfurt
 Rudolf Bial's Compositions - NYPL Digital Collections
 Bial, Rudolf - Libretto Portal der Bayerischen Staatsbibliothek

19th-century German composers
German Romantic composers
German classical violinists
Male classical violinists
German theatre directors
1834 births
1881 deaths
People from Bystrzyca Kłodzka
19th-century male musicians
19th-century musicians